In Chile, the centros de alumnos, also known as centros de estudiantes, are student organisations present in all the country's high schools and most of the primary schools.

Regulation
The regulation of the centros de alumnos is performed by the Ministry of Education, with the Decree number 524, which states:
 The educational institution cannot interfere in the election of a centro de alumnos, [and] at the same time, it is mandatory for every single high school (establecimiento de Enseñanza Media) to have a centro de alumnos.
 The centro de alumnos is elected democratically, through an election in which all the students of the educational institution have to participate.
 The centros de alumnos should have a president, a vice-president, a clerk, a financial secretary, and an executive secretary, they can also create delegations, according to the needs of the educational institution.
 The centros de alumnos are advised by two teachers of the educational institution, elected by the directive of the centro de alumnos of their respective schools, from a proposal of the council of delegates of class (Consejo de Delegados de Curso).

Rights
The centros de alumnos have the right to:
 Participate in the school council, and to actively participate
 Convoke a general assembly, in which all the students of their schools have to participate
 Convoke meetings with the directives of the different classes of their high schools or schools

External links
DS 524 sobre Centros de Estudiantes de Enseñanza Media (Supreme decree 524 on Students Centres of High Schools) 

Education in Chile
Students' unions in Chile